Arizona's 1st congressional district is a congressional district located in the U.S. state of Arizona, covering northeastern Maricopa County. Before 2023, geographically, it was the eleventh-largest congressional district in the country and included much of the state outside the Phoenix and Tucson metropolitan areas. From 2013 through 2022, it also included the Navajo Nation, the Hopi reservation, and the Gila River Indian Community, with 25% of the population being Native American. At that time, the district had more Native Americans than any other congressional district in the United States. In the 2022 elections, David Schweikert was elected in the redefined district. It was one of 18 districts that voted for Joe Biden in the 2020 presidential election while being won or held by a Republican in 2022.

The new 1st district includes Scottsdale, Paradise Valley, and Chandler; is majority-white; and is the wealthiest congressional district in Arizona.

History
When Arizona was first divided into congressional districts as a result of the 1950 Census, the 1st district comprised all of Maricopa County, home to Phoenix, while the rest of the state was in the 2nd district.  In a mid-decade redistricting resulting from Wesberry v. Sanders in 1967, the 1st was cut back to eastern Phoenix and most of what became the East Valley.

Over the years, the 1st's share of Phoenix was gradually reduced due to the area's explosive growth in the second half of the 20th century. However, it remained based in the East Valley until Arizona picked up two seats in the 2000 U.S. Census.  The old 1st essentially became the 6th district, while a new 1st district was created to serve most of the state outside of Phoenix and Tucson.

After the 2012 redistricting, the Hopi reservation was drawn into the 1st district; it had previously been included within the 2nd district. Also included were some northern suburbs of Tucson that had been in the 8th, as well as a tiny section of Phoenix itself near the Gila River Indian Community.  Meanwhile, heavily Republican Prescott, the old 1st's largest city, and much of surrounding Yavapai County were drawn into the new, heavily Republican 4th district.  The district is now considered to be significantly more competitive for Democrats.

2022-2031 areas covered
Northeastern Maricopa County, east of I-17 and north of Az-202 along the Salt River. It includes the northeastern suburbs of Phoenix, Scottsdale, Paradise Valley, Cave Creek, Fountain Hills, and the Fort McDowell Yavapai Nation.  It is essentially the successor to the 2012-2021 6th district.

2012-2021 areas covered
It covers the entirety of the following counties:
Apache County
Coconino County
Graham County
Greenlee County
Navajo County

The district covers the majority of:
 Pinal County

Small portions of the following counties are also covered:
Gila County
Maricopa County
Mohave County
Pima County
Yavapai County

Competitiveness
This large congressional district covers the mainly rural areas of northern and eastern Arizona. Democrats perform well in Flagstaff, Sedona, and the Navajo Nation among Native Americans, while Republicans are strongest in the more rural white areas. Elections are usually decided by conservative "Pinto Democrats" throughout the rural areas.  Due to its vast size, it is extremely difficult to campaign in and has few unifying influences.

George W. Bush received 54% of the vote in this district in 2004. John McCain also carried the district in 2008 with 54% of the vote while Barack Obama received 44%. In the 2012 presidential election Mitt Romney (R) won with 50% of the vote, with Obama receiving 48%. Due to intense competition, this is generally considered a swing district. The redistricting has increased the number of historically Democratic voters.

During the Super Tuesday, February 5, 2008 Arizona Democratic Primary, the district was won by Hillary Clinton with 49% of the vote, while Barack Obama received 42% and John Edwards took 5%. In the Arizona Republican Primary, the 1st district was won by McCain with 46% while Mitt Romney received 35% and Mike Huckabee took in 12% of the vote in the district.

Tom O'Halleran (D) won the congressional seat in 2016. The district was considered very competitive for both parties in the 2016 primaries and general election.

Voting

List of members representing the district 
Arizona gained a second congressional seat after the 1940 census. It used a general ticket to elect its representatives until the 1948 elections, when candidates ran from each of the districts.

Recent election results

2002

2004

2006

2008

2010

2012

2014

2016

2018

2020

2022

See also

 Arizona's congressional districts
 List of United States congressional districts

References 
General

Specific
 Demographic data from census.gov
 1998 election data from CNN.com
 2000 election data from CNN.com
 2002 Election Data from CBSNews
 2004 Election Data from CNN.com
 
 
 Congressional Biographical Directory of the United States 1774–present

External links
 
Map of Congressional Districts first in effect for the 2002 election
Final Congressional Map for the 2012 election
Official Congressional Map for the 2022 election

01
Government of Apache County, Arizona
Government of Coconino County, Arizona
Government of Gila County, Arizona
Government of Graham County, Arizona
Government of Maricopa County, Arizona
Government of Navajo County, Arizona
Government of Pinal County, Arizona
Casa Grande, Arizona
Flagstaff, Arizona
Gila River Indian Community
Holbrook, Arizona
Hopi Reservation
Navajo Nation government
Safford, Arizona
Winslow, Arizona
Constituencies established in 1949
1949 establishments in Arizona